Nishan Thilanka (born 2 January 1991) is a Sri Lankan cricketer. He made his Twenty20 debut on 6 January 2020, for Unichela Sports Club in the 2019–20 SLC Twenty20 Tournament.

References

External links
 

1991 births
Living people
Sri Lankan cricketers
Place of birth missing (living people)